The Modesto Transportation Center is a bus terminal and former train station located in downtown Modesto, California.

History

The Central Pacific Railroad was built through Modesto in 1870, and was taken over by the Southern Pacific in 1884. In 1915, the Southern Pacific Railroad built a new Mission Revival-style station. It was used until 1971, when Amtrak took over intercity passenger service. When Amtak restored service to Modesto with the San Joaquin in 1974, the former Santa Fe station in Riverbank was used instead. (It was replaced with the modern Modesto station in 1999.)

The depot was restored in 1993 as a bus terminal.

Rail service is expected to be restored in 2026 as part of the Altamont Corridor Express extension to Ceres. The station building is undergoing renovations to expand the passenger waiting area at a cost of $5.23 million.

References

External links
StanRTA – Downtown Transportation Center

Railway stations in Stanislaus County, California
Transportation in Modesto, California
History of Stanislaus County, California
Mission Revival architecture in California
Buildings and structures in Modesto, California
Modesto
Future Altamont Corridor Express stations
Railway stations in the United States opened in 1915
Railway stations closed in 1971
Railway stations scheduled to open in 2026
Bus stations in California